is a Japanese voice actress from Fukuoka Prefecture, Japan.

Filmography

Anime
Amada Anime Series: Super Mario Bros. (Narration)
Appleseed (Athena)
Berserk (Queen)
Cinderella Monogatari (Cinderella's stepmother)
Go! Princess PreCure (Yume Mochizuki)
Hinako Note (Grandmother)
Minky Momo (Devil Queen)
Magi: The Labyrinth of Magic (Baba)
Maison Ikkoku (Kamiogi)
Maya the Honey Bee (Thekla)
Minky Momo Tabidachi no Eki (OVA) (Mistress)
Mob Psycho 100: The Spirits and Such Consultation Office's First Company Outing ~A Healing Trip that Warms the Heart~ (OVA) (Okami's Mother)
Mobile Suit Gundam (Kamaria Ray)
Violet Evergarden (Tiffany Evergarden)
Overman King Gainer (Martena Lane)
Robotics;Notes (Kaoruko Usui)
Rumic World: The Laughing Target (Azusa's Mother)
Zillion (Admis)
Jigoku Shōjo Futakomori (Michiyo Takeda, ep 18)
Clannad After Story (Kindergarten principal, ep 19)
Chrome Shelled Regios (Delbone Quantis Miura)
Shiki (Setsuko Yasumori)

Video games
Kingdom Hearts series (Maleficent)

Dubbing

Live-action
Addams Family Values (Morticia Addams (Anjelica Huston))
Admission (Susannah (Lily Tomlin))
Anonymous Rex (Shin (Faye Dunaway))
Any Day Now (Judge Meyerson (Frances Fisher))
Armageddon (2002 Fuji TV edition) (Dottie (Grace Zabriskie))
Audrey (Anna Cataldi)
The Best Years of a Life (Anne Gauthier (Anouk Aimée))
The Birdcage (Louise Keeley (Dianne Wiest))
Bridget Jones's Baby (Mrs. Pamela Jones (Gemma Jones))
Diamonds Are Forever (Tiffany Case (Jill St. John))
The Duchess (Georgiana Spencer (Charlotte Rampling))
Duel (Mrs. Mann (Jacqueline Scott))
F9 (Magdalene Shaw (Helen Mirren))
The Fate of the Furious (Magdalene Shaw (Helen Mirren))
The Godfather (1976 NTV edition) (Sandra Corleone (Julie Gregg))
Grace and Frankie (Frankie Bergstein (Lily Tomlin))
Harry Potter and the Deathly Hallows – Part 1 (Auntie Muriel Weasley (Matyelok Gibbs))
Hobbs & Shaw (Magdalene Shaw  (Helen Mirren))
Home Alone 3 (2019 NTV edition) (Mrs. Hess (Marian Seldes))
In the Mood for Love (Mrs. Suen (Rebecca Pan))
Interstellar (Elderly Murph (Ellen Burstyn))
It Chapter Two (Mrs. Kersh (Joan Gregson))
Joy (Trudy (Isabella Rossellini))
Keys to the Heart (In-sook (Youn Yuh-jung))
Lake Placid (Delores Bickerman (Betty White))
Last Chance Harvey (Jean (Kathy Baker))
Letters to Juliet (Claire Smith-Wyman (Vanessa Redgrave))
The Lion, the Witch, and the Wardrobe (Mrs. Macready (Elizabeth Hawthorne))
A Little Princess (Miss Maria Minchin (Eleanor Bron))
Lucy in the Sky (Nana Holbrook (Ellen Burstyn))
Mad Max Beyond Thunderdome (1988 Fuji TV edition) (Aunty Entity (Tina Turner))
Mad Max: Fury Road (Miss Giddy (Jennifer Hagan))
The Matrix Revolutions (2007 Fuji TV edition) (The Oracle (Mary Alice))
The Mermaid (Mermaid Shitai (Shuzhen Fan))
The Messenger: The Story of Joan of Arc (Yolande of Aragon (Faye Dunaway))
Mission: Impossible (1999 Fuji TV/2003 TV Asahi editions) (Max (Vanessa Redgrave))
The Ninth Gate (Baroness Kessler (Barbara Jefford))
Noelle (Elf Polly (Shirley MacLaine))
The Nude Bomb (1988 TV Asahi edition) (Edith Von Secondberg (Rhonda Fleming))
Ocean's Twelve (2007 NTV edition) (Molly Starr (Cherry Jones))
Panic (Deidre (Barbara Bain))
Post Grad (Maureen Malby (Carol Burnett))
Practical Magic (Aunt Bridget 'Jet' Owens (Dianne Wiest))
Private School (1984 Fuji TV edition) (Ms. Regina Copoletta (Sylvia Kristel))
The Punisher (Lady Tanaka (Kim Miyori))
Rabbit Hole (Nat (Dianne Wiest))
Roald Dahl's Esio Trot (Mrs Lavinia Silver (Judi Dench))
The Secret Life of Walter Mitty (Edna Mitty (Shirley MacLaine))
Smash (Eileen Rand (Anjelica Huston))
Sonny & Jed (1979 TV Tokyo edition) (Betty (Laura Betti))
Step Brothers (Nancy Huff-Doback (Mary Steenburgen))
Super Mario Bros. (1994 NTV edition) (Lena (Fiona Shaw))
Superhero Movie (Aunt Lucille (Marion Ross))
Superman II (1984 TV Asahi edition) (Lara (Susannah York))
Sweet Home Alabama (Mayor Kate Hennings (Candice Bergen))
Texas Chainsaw Massacre (Virginia "Ginny" McCumber (Alice Krige))
Tomorrow Never Dies and The World Is Not Enough (M (Judi Dench))
Tooth Fairy (Lily (Julie Andrews))
Two and a Half Men (Evelyn Harper (Holland Taylor))
The Wicker Man (Miss Rose (Diane Cilento))
Working Girl (Katharine Parker (Sigourney Weaver))
The Young Indiana Jones Chronicles (Helen Margaret Seymour (Margaret Tyzack))

Animation
Cars 2 (Mama Topolino)
Maya the Bee Movie (Queen Bee)
Shrek 2 (Queen Lillian)
Shrek the Third (Queen Lillian)
Shrek Forever After (Queen Lillian)
The Simpsons (Judge Constance Harm)
Sleeping Beauty (Maleficent)
SpongeBob SquarePants (Miss Gristlepuss)

References

External links
  
 

1936 births
Living people
Japanese video game actresses
Japanese voice actresses
Voice actresses from Fukuoka Prefecture
20th-century Japanese actresses
21st-century Japanese actresses